San Floriano del Collio is a comune (municipality) in the Province of Gorizia in the Italian region Friuli-Venezia Giulia, located about  northwest of Trieste and about  northwest of Gorizia, on the border with Slovenia, and borders the following municipalities: Brda (Slovenia), Capriva del Friuli, Cormons, Gorizia, Mossa.

San Floriano del Collio localities include Grojna/Groina, Ščedno/Scedina, Bukovje/Bucuie, Valerišče/Valerisce, Jazbine/Giasbana, Aščevo/Asci, Križišče/Bivio, and Sovenca/Sovenza.

Ethnic composition

91.4% of the population were Slovenes according to the 1971 census. Most of the locals speak the Brda dialect of Slovene, which is traditionally present on the whole territory of the municipality.

Demographic evolution

References

See also
Julian March
Gorizia and Gradisca
Slovene Lands

Cities and towns in Friuli-Venezia Giulia